Blood on the Moon is the fifth studio album by American experimental rock band Chrome. It was released on May 31, 1981 by Don't Fall Off the Mountain.

Reception 
Ned Raggett of AllMusic opined that, with Blood on the Moon, "Chrome veered towards creating more 'regular' rock music, if only conceptually".

Track listing

Personnel 
 Chrome

 Helios Creed – vocals, guitar, production, sleeve graphics
 Damon Edge – vocals, Moog synthesizer, production, sleeve graphics
 Hilary Stench – bass guitar
 John Stench – drums

 Technical

 Oliver (Oliver Dicicco) – recording

References

External links 

 

1981 albums
Beggars Banquet Records albums
Chrome (band) albums